Caledonian Hospital opened in 1910, merged with the 1840s-founded Brooklyn Hospital in 1982 and closed in 2003. Pre-merger, Brooklyn had 444 beds and Caledonian 209.

Caledonian's seven-story structure subsequently became a "luxury rental with 120 units."

History
The hospital's founder's son, Donald G. C. Sinclair (c. 1905–1976), was the president and subsequently chairman of the board.

By 1987, Brooklyn Caledonian's Caledonian Campus had a new wing, effectively doubling that location's size. Funding was via loans that were backed by the Federal Housing Authority.

References

  

Defunct hospitals in Brooklyn